Večkoti is a small settlement southeast of the village of Štanjel in the Municipality  of Komen in the Littoral region of Slovenia.

References

External links

Večkoti on Geopedia

Populated places in the Municipality of Komen